Fixin to Thrill is the second studio album by Canadian electronic music band Dragonette, released on September 25, 2009 by Universal Music Canada.

Track listing

Notes
 LP pressings of the album omit the track "We Rule the World".

Personnel
Credits adapted from the liner notes of Fixin to Thrill.

Dragonette
 Martina Sorbara – vocals ; keyboards 
 Dan Kurtz – keyboards, programming ; guitar ; bass ; backing vocals ; acoustic guitar 
 Joel Stouffer – drums ; programming ; percussion ; keyboards 
 Christopher Hugget – guitar 

Additional personnel

 Caitlin Abogouv – choir 
 Rich Andrews – design
 Black Wrappers – production
 Leo Cackett – band photography
 Jason Chhangur – mixing assistance
 Emily Cho – choir 
 Jacqueline Cohen – choir 
 Brian Crone – saxophone 
 Perry Curties – photography
 Chris Gehringer – mastering
 Evangeline Gogou – choir 
 Alison Goldlist – choir 

 Dan Grech-Marguerat – mixing
 Mira Korngold – choir 
 Yaela Korngold – choir 
 Jackson Long – assistant recording
 Rob Mee – trombone 
 Punkdafunk Inc – management
 Sara Quin – backing vocals 
 Eric Ratz – drum recording
 Joseph Shabason – saxophone 
 Will Stapleton – guitar 
 Kurt Swinghammer – guitar

Charts

Release history

References

2009 albums
Dragonette albums
Universal Music Canada albums